The 2002 UEFA Intertoto Cup finals were won by Málaga, Fulham, and Stuttgart. All three teams advanced to the UEFA Cup.

First round

First leg

The game was awarded to Levadia Tallinn with a score of 3–0 due to União de Leiria fielding an ineligible player Roudolphe Douala.

Second leg

3–3 on aggregate, St Patrick's Athletic won on away goals rule.

Lokeren won 5–4 on aggregate.

Santa Clara won 5–3 on aggregate.

BATE Borisov won 4–0 on aggregate.

Haka won 3–2 on aggregate.

Zürich won 8–2 on aggregate.

Gloria Bistrița won 2–0 on aggregate.

Slaven Belupo won 6–3 on aggregate.

Synot won 4–0 on aggregate.

Helsingborgs won 1–0 on aggregate.

Žalgiris won 1–0 on aggregate.

St. Gallen won 11–1 on aggregate.

Dinaburg won 2–1 on aggregate.

Ashdod won 6–1 on aggregate.

Bregenz won 5–1 on aggregate.

Levadia Tallinn won 4–2 on aggregate.

Teuta won 2–1 on aggregate.

Coleraine won 7–2 on aggregate.

Marek won 3–1 on aggregate.

FH won 4–3 on aggregate.

Second round

First leg

Second leg

Slaven Belupo won 3–0 on aggregate.

Troyes won 4–2 on aggregate.

BATE Borisov won 5–0 on aggregate.

Villarreal won 4–2 on aggregate.

1–1 on aggregate, Fulham won on away goals rule.

Sochaux won 4–1 on aggregate.

3–3 on aggregate, Gent won on away goals rule.

Stuttgart won 3–0 on aggregate.

Torino won 2–1 on aggregate.

Krylia Sovetov won 4–0 on aggregate.

Teplice won 9–2 on aggregate.

Willem II won 2–1 on aggregate.

Zürich won 1–0 on aggregate.

Synot won 4–2 on aggregate.

Gloria Bistrița won 3–1 on aggregate.

Marek won 2–1 on aggregate.

Third round

First leg

Second leg

3–3 on aggregate, Willem II won on away goals rule.

1–1 on aggregate, Troyes won on away goals rule.

Stuttgart won 4–3 on aggregate.

Fulham won 2–1 on aggregate.

Lille won 3–0 on aggregate.

Teplice won 5–2 on aggregate.

Bologna won 2–0 on aggregate.

Málaga won 4–1 on aggregate.

Slaven Belupo won 6–1 on aggregate.

Sochaux won 3–0 on aggregate.

2–2 aggregate. Villarreal won on penalties.

Aston Villa won 3–2 on aggregate.

Semi-finals

First leg

Second leg

Stuttgart won 3–1 on aggregate.

Bologna won 8–2 on aggregate.

The game was awarded 3–0 to Villareal due to Troyes fielding an ineligible player David Vairelles. Villarreal won 3–0 on aggregate.

Fulham won 3–0 on aggregate.

Málaga won 3–1 on aggregate.

Lille won 3–1 on aggregate.

Finals

First leg

Second leg

Stuttgart won 2–1 on aggregate.

Fulham won 5–3 on aggregate.

Málaga won 2–1 on aggregate.

See also
2002–03 UEFA Champions League
2002–03 UEFA Cup

References

External links
Official site
Results at RSSSF

UEFA Intertoto Cup
3